Bitumne is a village located in Simferopol Municipality. Population:

See also
Simferopol Municipality

References

Villages in Crimea
Simferopol Municipality